Better Than Anything is an album by vocalist Irene Kral performing with Junior Mance's Trio that was recorded in 1963 and originally released on the Äva label.

Reception

The Allmusic review by Scott Yanow stated: "Kral is quite recognizable, although not singing with quite the emotional intensity that she would display during her final three albums (which are all classics) ... Kral was already a delightful singer."

Track listing
 "Better Than Anything" (David "Buck" Wheat, Bill Loughborough) – 2:21 
 "The Touch of Your Lips" (Ray Noble) – 2:22
 "The Meaning of the Blues" (Bobby Troup, Leah Worth) – 3:11
 "Rock Me to Sleep" (Benny Carter, Paul Vandervoort II) – 2:20
 "No More" (Tutti Camarata, Bob Russell) – 3:10
 "Passing By" (Laurent Hess, Charles Trenet, Jack Lawrence) – 1:54 
 "It's a Wonderful World" (Jan Savitt, Harold Adamson, Johnny Watson) – 2:34
 "This Is Always" (Mack Gordon, Harry Warren) – 3:23
 "Just Friends" (John Klenner, Sam M. Lewis) – 2:40
 "Guess I'll Hang My Tears Out to Dry" (Jule Styne, Sammy Cahn) – 3:35 
 "Nobody Else But Me" (Jerome Kern, Oscar Hammerstein II) – 1:54

Personnel 
Irene Kral – vocals
Junior Mance – piano
Bob Cranshaw – bass
Mickey Roker – drums

References 

1963 albums
Irene Kral albums
Junior Mance albums
Äva Records albums